Warr is a surname, and may refer to:

People
 Antony Warr (1913-1995), English rugby union player
 Augustus Frederick Warr (1847–1908), English lawyer and Conservative party politician
 Charles Warr (1892–1969), Church of Scotland minister and author
 Danny Warr (1905–1972), Australian rules footballer
 John Warr (1927–2016), English cricketer
 Peter Warr (1938–2010), English businessman, racing driver
 Simon Warr (1953-2020), Welsh television personality, BBC radio broadcaster, writer and former teacher
 Steve Warr (born 1950s), British television director and producer
 Steve Warr (ice hockey) (born 1951), Canadian professional ice hockey player

See also
 Earl De La Warr
 Warre

Warr as a word
 Warr (disambiguation)